Brigitte Massin (21 July 1927 – 5 December 2002) was a French musicologist and journalist.

With her husband Jean Massin, she published numerous works on music. Brigitte Massin is the mother of Béatrice Massin, a specialist of Baroque dance.

Biography 
Massin has written extensive biographical works on classical and romantic composers. She specialized in Franz Schubert, Wolfgang Amadeus Mozart and Beethoven.

Publications

In collaboration with Jean Massin 
1955(2nd edition: 1967): 
1959: 
1970: 
1997: 
1987:

Other works 
1977: 
1989: 
1991: 
1991: 
1999:

References

External links 
 Brigitte Massin on Encyclopedia Universalis
 Obituary in L'Humanité
 Brigitte Massin on France Culture
 Brigitte Massin on Babelio
 Massin, Brigitte et Jean (1927-2002 et 1917-1986) on IMEC
 Portrait de Jean et Brigitte Massin on INA.fr (1970)

20th-century French musicologists
Women musicologists
French biographers
1927 births
2002 deaths
20th-century women musicians